The Thompson Okanagan Senior Lacrosse League (TOSLL) is a men's Senior C amateur box lacrosse league sanctioned by the British Columbia Lacrosse Association in Canada. Originally formed in 1994 as the Interior Senior Lacrosse League, the name changed after 1999 to Thompson Xtreme Lacrosse League. Before the 2012 season the league again renamed to the current TOSLL.

Teams

Former teams
 Kelowna Kodiaks/Warriors (1994-2002)
Kelowna Raiders (2001-2017) - went on one-year hiatus in 2018 
 Vernon Tigers/Royals (1994-2012)

Champions

References

External links
TOSLL stats

Lacrosse leagues in British Columbia
Sports leagues established in 1994
1994 establishments in British Columbia